R3.0 is the seventeenth studio album by Filipino singer Regine Velasquez. It was released on October 21, 2017, by Viva Records. It is Velasquez' comeback album under the record label after parting ways with VIVA in 2007 and released coincide her 30th anniversary concert held at Mall of Asia Arena. The album was certified Platinum by PARI with sales of 15,000 physical CD copies and digital album copies sold. The album consists of 30 songs. Velasquez worked on the album in less than a year, co-producing it with various musicians. She regularly uploaded pictures of her recording sessions on her Instagram account.

Thematically, R3.0 represents the singer's artistry and way of celebrating her 30th anniversary in the business. The 3-disc album are separated into 3 titles called Reflections which consists of re-recorded songs that Velasquez released in the past, Renditions features covers from other artists that impacted her singing career the most and Rise which features new original songs.

R3.0 reached number one on iTunes Philippines and achieved Platinum Record Award after 6 weeks of its official release.

Track listing
Credits adapted from the liner notes of R3.0.

Personnel
The following people are credited on the album:

Managerial

Regine Velasquez – executive and album producer
Vic Del Rosario – executive producer
Tony M. Ocampo – executive producer
Vincent Del Rosario – executive producer
MG O. Mozo – supervising producer
Baby A. Gil – supervising producer

Diana Velasquez-Roque – associate producer
Guia Gil-Ferrer – associate producer
Civ Fontanilla - A&R direction
Yen Barrette - A&R coordination

Performance credits

Regine Velasquez –vocals, background vocals, background vocal arrangement
Nate V. Alcasid – guest vocals
Raul Mitra – background vocal arrangement
Suy Galvez – background vocals

Gail Blanco – background vocals
Riva Ferrer-Jose – background vocals arrangement
JC Jose – background vocals
Tommy Virtucio – background vocals

Visuals and imagery

Mark Nicdao – photography
Cacai Velasquez-Mitra – art director
Anna Paulino – layout and design
Veron Gonzalez – stylist
Raj Rivera – stylist
Martin Bautista – wardrobe

Cheetah Rivera – wardrobe
Edwin Tan – wardrobe
UNIQLO – wardrobe
Jonathan Velasco – hairstylist
Regine Velasquez – makeup artist

Instruments, Technical and Production

Janno Queyquep – guitar, ukulele
Chino David – violin
Ted Amper – cello

Joel Mendoza – mastering, mixing, recording engineer
Cris Buenviaje – recording engineer
Ponz Martinez – recording engineer

Charts

Certifications

Release history

References

2017 albums
Regine Velasquez albums